Network utilities are software utilities designed to analyze and configure various aspects of computer networks. The majority of them originated on Unix systems, but several later ports to other operating systems exist.

The most common tools (found on most operating systems) include:
 , ping a host to check connectivity (reports packet loss and latency, uses ICMP).
  shows the series of successive systems a packet goes through en route to its destination on a network.  It works by sending packets with sequential TTLs which generate ICMP TTL-exceeded messages from the hosts the packet passes through.
 vnStat, useful command to monitor network traffic from the console. vnstat allows to keep the traffic information in a log system to be analyzed by third party tools.

Other network utilities include:
 , displays  network connections (both incoming and outgoing), routing tables, and a number of network interface and network protocol statistics. It is used for finding problems in the network and to determine the amount of traffic on the network as a performance measurement.
 , which sprays numerous packets in the direction of a host and reports results
  allows local or remote configuration of network devices, Microsoft Windows

Some usages of network configuration tools also serve to display and diagnose networks, for example:
  (on Linux)
  (on Unix)
  (on Windows)
  can display an IP routing table

Main network utilities

List of the most useful network commands

References

Network performance
Utility software types

Further reading
 Optimal Iterative Method for Network Utility Maximization with Intertemporal Constraints
 Utility and governmental services
 Responsive Webdesign (in German)